Eldorado Township, Nebraska may refer to the following places in Nebraska:

 Eldorado Township, Clay County, Nebraska
 Eldorado Township, Harlan County, Nebraska

See also
Eldorado Township (disambiguation)
Nebraska township disambiguation pages